John Shaft is a fictional character created by author/screenwriter Ernest Tidyman for the 1970 novel of the same name. He was portrayed by Richard Roundtree in the original 1971 film and in its four sequels, Shaft's Big Score! (1972), Shaft in Africa (1973), Shaft (2000) and Shaft (2019), and the seven 1973–74 Shaft television films, with Samuel L. Jackson portraying his son (introduced as his nephew), named John Shaft II, in Shaft (2000) and Shaft (2019), and Jessie Usher portraying the character's grandson (named John "J.J." Shaft Jr.) in Shaft (2019). The blurb on the paperback on which the original film is based states Shaft is "Hotter than Bond, cooler than Bullitt."

Fictional biography

Abilities
John Shaft's weapon of choice is a Smith & Wesson Model 36, Beretta 92FS or an M1911 pistol. Shaft is also a practitioner of several styles of martial arts that includes western Boxing, Wing Chun, Judo, Jujitsu, Shotokan, and Kyokushin Karate.

Shaft franchise

Novel series
The franchise began with the novel Shaft, which provides a much more detailed backstory for John Shaft than the one seen in the film series. All of the books in the original 1970s series are credited solely to Shaft creator Ernest Tidyman, but from Shaft's Big Score onward Tidyman wrote them with assistance from ghostwriters Robert Turner and Philip Rock.

 Shaft (1970)
 Shaft Among the Jews (1972)
 Shaft's Big Score (1972)
 Shaft Has a Ball (1973)
 Goodbye, Mr. Shaft (1973)
 Shaft's Carnival of Killers (1974)
 The Last Shaft (1975) - published only in England
 Shaft's Revenge (2016) (written by David F. Walker)

Recurring relationships in the novels and films
 Vic Anderozzi: A lieutenant of detectives with the New York Police Department, and Shaft's contact.
 Rollie Nickerson: Owner of the No Name Bar which Shaft frequents, and a part-time actor.
 Mrs. Klonsky: Shaft's Polish-American housekeeper.
 Mildred: The phone operator who handles Shaft's answering service.
 Ben Buford: A black revolutionary who grew up with Shaft.
 Marvin Green: Shaft's accountant.
 Helen Green: Wife of Shaft's accountant.
 Bumpy Jonas: A mobster turned ally.
 John Shaft II: Shaft's son. A brash, headstrong, and sharp NYPD detective who quits the force and becomes a private investigator after growing tired of corruption in the legal system. Appears in the 2000 and 2019 films.
 John Shaft III, a.k.a. "J.J." : Shaft's grandson. A nerdy, well-mannered FBI agent and computer expert who eventually opts to join his father and grandfather in their private investigations. Only appears in the 2019 film.

Comic strip
Between the release of the first Shaft film and the novel Shaft Among the Jews, Tidyman began developing a Shaft daily syndicated newspaper comic strip. He commissioned artist Don Rico, with whom he produced 24 sample strips, but despite the character's popularity in both novels and films he was unable to find a syndicate interested in distributing the Shaft strip, which remains unpublished.

Comic book series
The Shaft! comic book was published by Dynamite Entertainment, written by David F. Walker and illustrated by Bilquis Evely, beginning in December 2014. New stories following young John Shaft's earliest adventures were adapted closely from the Ernest Tidyman novels.

 Shaft: A Complicated Man (2014) (writer: David F. Walker, artist: Bilquis Evely)
 Shaft: Imitation of Life (2016) (writer: David F. Walker, artist: Dietrich Smith)

Film and television franchise

Film series

Television films

The television show ran from 1973 to 1974, with Richard Roundtree reprising the role of John Shaft. There were seven 90-minute movies, part of the New CBS Tuesday Night Movies, rotating with Hawkins, which starred James Stewart.

Cast and characters

 A dark grey cell indicates the character was not in the film.

John Shaft in other media
 Burger King utilized the Shaft character for promotion, and even somewhat parodied Shaft utilizing Shaquille O'Neal.
 The USA Network's promo for their series Monk was modeled after the Shaft remake in 2000.
 Geena Davis parodied the Shaft remake/sequel in promos for her short-lived television series, The Geena Davis Show.
 In Season 2's episode  "Ants in Pants!", The Tick featured the Tick meeting "Taft." On confirming that it is he, the man says "Darn right." This would be reprised in the Season 3 episode, "That Moustache Feeling".
 A song entitled "Shaft in Greenland" appeared on The Dead Milkmen's album Soul Rotation.
 In the TV series The Fresh Prince of Bel-Air, Will Smith frequently references Shaft as one of his favorite film characters, believing the character to be a real person (Richard Roundtree himself guest-starred in two episodes of the show, playing two different characters.)
 In the anime TV series Cowboy Bebop episode "Mushroom Samba", he is the namesake of one of the Shaft brothers, hoping to avenge his brother's death. He is voiced by Hōchū Ōtsuka in the 1999 Japanese version and by Beau Billingslea in the 2001 English dub.
 Broomhilda Von Shaft, a character in Quentin Tarantino's Django Unchained, was named to suggest a relationship to John Shaft. Stated Tarantino: "Her and Django will eventually have a baby, and then that baby will have a baby, and that baby will have a baby, and that baby will have a baby, and that baby will have a baby ... and one of these days, John Shaft will be born".

Parodies in other films
 Good Burger
 I'm Gonna Git You Sucka
 I Got The Hook Up
 Black Dynamite
 The Hebrew Hammer

Reception
The character has had a mostly positive response.

Literary references

References

External links
 Page from 'Thrilling Detectives'
 Steve Aldous' Guide to Shaft

Film characters introduced in 1970
Fictional private investigators
Fictional shotokan practitioners
Fictional kyokushin kaikan practitioners
Fictional Brazilian jiu-jitsu practitioners
Fictional Wing Chun practitioners
Fictional Shaolin kung fu practitioners
Fictional judoka
Characters in American novels of the 20th century
Male characters in film
Series of books
Fictional African-American people
Black characters in films